Lariyar is a small village in Tral area of Pulwama district in Jammu and Kashmir, India. The population was 1,167 at the 2011 Indian census.

References 

Villages in Pulwama district